Purim humor, Purim jokes, and Purim pranks are  elements of joyful celebration of the holiday of Purim. Notable expressions of Purim humor of long tradition are Purim Torah and Purim spiel.

Purim Torah and Purim spiel

Purim Torah are humorous and satirical comments in the learned style of talmudic or halakhic comments  in relation to  Purim and read during Purim. A notable historical example is the 14th century Masekhet Purim (A Tractate on Purim) by Kalonymus ben Kalonymus, condemned by many scholars.

A Purim spiel ("Purim play") is a dramatization of classical stories, most often of the Book of Esther, in which the story of Purim is recounted. This tradition dates at least to mid-16th century. Over time  it acquired the comic character. Today, Purim spiels can be comedies about anything related to Jews and Judaism.

Before the Purim of 1993, a parody on parody appeared on soc.culture.jewish in a thread titled "Talmud Fortran" with commentary on computer programming in the style of Purim Torah. Some comments: "As I recall you are not (in certain days) permitted to separate the good from the bad. How does this apply to debugging programs during these days?" - "So long as there is less than one part in 60 of bugs in the code, it is kosher...<>"

Purim jokes and pranks
Purim pranks may be insulting and even harmful.  There is a scholarship on what Halakha says on whether harm, insult (lashon hara), or injury – whether physical (towards property or a person) or verbal – are admissible in the course of Purim pranks or jokes. There are various interpretations, however Rav Yosef Zvi Rimon comes to a conclusion that insults and minor physical harm are admissible as long they are sincere expressions of joy of mitzva and the harmful acts were not of evil intention; this kind of humor must be used with caution. Purim jokes are for the joy of mitzva, not for just jesting.   Purim spiels may include a good deal of insults and foul language directed both at biblical characters and modern real persons.

Notable public Purim pranks

On February 24, 2021 (a day before Purim that year), The Jerusalem Post tweeted that Benjamin Netanyahu could not get hold of Joe Biden  for a month because the latter gave him a wrong number which replied "Hello, this is not the person you were trying to call. You’ve reached the rejection hotline. Unfortunately the person who gave you this rejection hotline number did not want you to have their real number."

In March 2019 Esther Voet, a columnist of a respected Dutch Jewish weekly NIW  announced that she was moving to Israel, where  "getting called a dirty Jew simply means I have to take a bath", complaining about the rise of anti-Semitism in the country. Later she announced that it was a Purim prank, but not earlier than her announcement made waves  and she received  notes of condolence and wishes of good luck from one camp and "good riddance" from the other.

In March 2017, one of the annual Purim pranks pulled by the officials of the town of Psagot garnered much attention: the social media got ahold of a letter on official stationery that Jared Kushner and Ivanka Trump would be visiting the town for Shabbos and Kushner would be delivering a dvar Torah in the local synagogue. Hundreds of people  from the nearby places phoned the residents of Psagot to ask for a stay during the event, while  leftist groups started arranging buses with protesters.

In February 2010, the residents of Bnei Brak fell to the prank pulled by a construction company ZAKA, who announced that oil was about to be drilled there, with posters, equipment, and all, and hinted that the residents would be exempt from local property taxes.

See also
, a musical by Itzik Manger in the style of Purim spiel
Adloyada
Latke–Hamantash Debate
Feast of Fools
Jewish humor
Purim rabbi

References

Jewish comedy and humor
Purim